Cape Sobral is a high, mainly snow-covered elevation which surmounts the south end of Sobral Peninsula on the east coast of Graham Land in Antarctica. It forms the east side of the entrance to Mundraga Bay and west side of the entrance to Larsen Inlet. Discovered by the Swedish Antarctic Expedition, 1901–04, under Nordenskjold, who named it for Lieutenant Jose M. Sobral of the Argentine Navy, asst. physicist and meteorologist with the expedition.

External links
 Cape Sobral. Copernix satellite image

Headlands of Graham Land
Nordenskjöld Coast